Port Jackson, consisting of the waters of Sydney Harbour, Middle Harbour, North Harbour and the Lane Cove and Parramatta Rivers, is the ria or natural harbour of Sydney, New South Wales, Australia. The harbour is an inlet of the Tasman Sea (part of the South Pacific Ocean). It is the location of the Sydney Opera House and Sydney Harbour Bridge. The location of the first European settlement and colony on the Australian mainland, Port Jackson has continued to play a key role in the history and development of Sydney.

Port Jackson, in the early days of the colony, was also used as a shorthand for Sydney and its environs. Thus, many botanists, see, e.g, Robert Brown's  Prodromus Florae Novae Hollandiae et Insulae Van Diemen, described their specimens as having been collected at Port Jackson.

Many recreational events are based on or around the harbour itself, particularly Sydney New Year's Eve celebrations. The harbour is also the starting point of the Sydney to Hobart Yacht Race.

The waterways of Port Jackson are managed by Transport for NSW. Sydney Harbour National Park protects a number of islands and foreshore areas, swimming spots, bushwalking tracks and picnic areas.

History

At the time of the European arrival and colonisation, the land around Port Jackson was inhabited by the Eora clans, including the Gadigal, Cammeraygal, and Wangal. The Gadigal inhabited the land stretching along the south side of Port Jackson from what is now South Head, in an arc west to the present Darling Harbour. The Cammeraygal lived on the northern side of the harbour. The area along the southern banks of the Parramatta River to Rose Hill belonged to the Wangal. The Eora inhabited Port Jackson (Sydney Harbour), south to the Georges River and west to Parramatta.

Cook's naming of Port Jackson
The first recorded European discovery of Sydney Harbour was by Lieutenant James Cook in 1770. Cook named the inlet after Sir George Jackson, one of the Lords Commissioners of the British Admiralty, and Judge Advocate of the Fleet. As the Endeavour sailed past the entrance at Sydney Heads, Cook wrote in his journal "at noon we were...about 2 or 3 miles from the land and abrest of a bay or harbour within there appeared to be a safe anchorage which I called Port Jackson."

First Fleet
Eighteen years later, Port Jackson saw the arrival of the First Fleet. On 21 January 1788, after arriving at Botany Bay, Governor Arthur Phillip took a longboat and two cutters up the coast to sound the entrance and examine Cook's Port Jackson. Phillip first stayed overnight at Camp Cove, just inside the South Head, then moved up the harbour, landing at Sydney Cove and then Manly Cove, before returning to Botany Bay on the afternoon of 24 January. Phillip returned to Sydney Cove in HM Armed Tender Supply on 26 January 1788, where he established the first colony in Australia, later to become the city of Sydney. In his first dispatch from the colony back to England, Governor Phillip noted that:

Port Jackson was described as a "capacious harbour, equal, if not superior to any yet known in the world", that "sheltered anchorage for the ships" and provided "a suitable landing place on rocks on the western side of the cove, relatively level land at the head of the cove, and a run of fresh water", in addition to it being "capable of affording security to a much larger fleet than would probably ever seek for shelter or security in it." Royal Navy officer David Blackburn also described it as a "fine Harbour as Any in the World, with water for any Number of the Largest ships."

Later events

The Great White Fleet, the United States Navy battle fleet, arrived in Port Jackson in August 1908 by order of U.S. President Theodore Roosevelt. From 1938, seaplanes landed in Sydney Harbour on Rose Bay, making this Sydney's first international airport.

Attack on Sydney Harbour

In 1942, to protect Sydney Harbour from a submarine attack, the Sydney Harbour anti-submarine boom net was constructed. It spanned the harbour from Green (Laings) Point, Watsons Bay to the battery at Georges Head, on the other side of the harbour. On the night of 31 May 1942, three Japanese midget submarines entered the harbour, one of which became entangled in the western end of the boom net's central section. Unable to free their submarine, the crew detonated charges, killing themselves in the process. A second midget submarine came to grief in Taylor's Bay, the two crew committing suicide. The third submarine fired two torpedoes at USS Chicago (both missed) before leaving the harbour. In November 2006, this submarine was found off Sydney's Northern Beaches.

The anti-submarine boom net was demolished soon after World War II, and all that remains are the foundations of the old boom net winch house, which can be viewed on Green (Laings) Point, Watsons Bay. Today, the Australian War Memorial has on display a composite of the two midget submarines salvaged from Sydney Harbour. The conning tower of one of the midget submarines is on display at the RAN Heritage Centre, Garden Island, Sydney.

Fortifications

Fort Denison is a former penal site and defensive facility occupying a small island located north-east of the Royal Botanic Gardens in Sydney Harbour.

There are fortifications at Sydney Heads and elsewhere, some of which are now heritage listed. The earliest date from the 1830s, and were designed to defend Sydney from seaborn attack or convict uprisings. There are four historical fortifications located between Taronga Zoo and Middle Head, Mosman, they are: the Middle Head Fortifications, the Georges Head Battery, the Lower Georges Heights Commanding Position and a small fort located on Bradleys Head, known as the Bradleys Head Fortification Complex. The forts were built from sandstone quarried on site and consist of various tunnels, underground rooms, open batteries and casemated batteries, shell rooms, gunpowder magazines, barracks and trenches.

Geography

 

Geologically, Port Jackson is a drowned river valley, or ria. It is 19 km long with an area of 55 km2. The estuary's volume at high tide is 562 million cubic metres. The perimeter of the estuary is 317 kilometres.

According to the Geographical Names Board of New South Wales, Port Jackson is "a harbour which comprises all the waters within an imaginary line joining North Head and South Head. Within this harbour lies North Harbour, Middle Harbour and Sydney Harbour."

Port Jackson extends westward from the single entrance known as Sydney Heads (North and South Heads) and encompasses all tidal waters within North Harbour, Middle Harbour, Sydney Harbour, Darling Harbour, Parramatta River and Lane Cove River.

The harbour is heavily embayed. The bays on the south side tend to be wide and rounded, whereas those on the north side are generally narrow inlets.  Many of these bays include beaches. The Sydney central business district extends from Circular Quay.

Headlands and peninsulas 

East to west, north side:

 North Head
 Dobroyd Head
 Middle Head
 Georges Head
 Bradleys Head
 Cremorne Point
 Kurraba Point
 Kirribilli
 McMahons Point
 Balls Head
 Berry Island

East to west, south side

 South Head
 Point Piper
 Darling Point
 Potts Point
 Bennelong Point
 Dawes Point
 Millers Point
 Pyrmont 
 Balmain

Islands
There are several islands within the harbour, including Shark Island, Clark Island, Fort Denison, Goat Island, Cockatoo Island, Spectacle Island, Snapper Island and Rodd Island. Some other former islands, including Garden Island, Glebe Island and Berry Island, have been linked to the shore by land reclamation, though their names often still contain the word "island". Two other former islands, Bennelong Island and Darling Island, are similarly now linked to the mainland, but rarely mentioned as islands. The former Dawes Island was joined to another small island to create Spectacle Island. Exposed at low tide is Sow and Pigs Reef, a well-known navigation obstacle near the main shipping lane.

Tributaries and waterways
 Tank Stream was a freshwater course emptying into Sydney Cove. Today it is little more than a stormwater drain but originally it was the fresh water supply for the fledgling colony of New South Wales. It originated from a swamp to the west of present-day Hyde Park and at high tide entered Sydney Cove at the intersection of Bridge and Pitt Streets.
 Middle Harbour is the northern arm of Port Jackson. It begins as a small creek (Middle Harbour Creek) at St Ives. It joins the main waterway between two headlands, Middle Head and Grotto Point Reserve, west of Sydney Heads.
 Parramatta River is the western arm of Port Jackson. The river begins at the confluence of Toongabbie Creek and Darling Mills Creek west of Parramatta and joins the main waterway between Greenwich Point, Greenwich, and Robinsons Point, Birchgrove.
 Lane Cove River rises near Thornleigh and flows generally south for about 15 kilometres (9.3 mi). Its catchment area is approximately 95.4 square kilometres (36.8 sq mi).
 Tarban Creek, a northern tributary of the Parramatta River, enters Port Jackson at Hunters Hill.
 Johnstons Creek rises in Stanmore and flows in a generally northward direction, passing through the inner-western suburbs of Forest Lodge, Annandale and Glebe. The creek passes beneath the stands of the now demolished Harold Park Paceway prior to emptying into Rozelle Bay at Bicentennial Park, Glebe. Orphan School Creek is a tributary.
 Duck River is a perennial stream and southern tributary of the Parramatta River.

Climate

Port Jackson has a humid subtropical climate (Köppen: Cfa) with warm, somewhat humid summers and mild to cool winters, with moderate rainfall spread throughout the year. Due to its exposed proximity to the Tasman Sea, it is slightly cooler, wetter and windier than Observatory Hill to the west. In addition to featuring the lowest maximum summer temperatures in the Sydney region (averaging just 24.4 °C (75.9 °F)), Port Jackson is also least affected by extreme heat due to frequent sea breezes. Conversely, winter nights are among the warmest in Sydney, and rarely dip below , although fog often occurs and may be disruptive. 

Port Jackson's weather station is located within a lighthouse just south of Georges Head at Georges Heights in Mosman and is adjacent to the suburbs of Vaucluse, Point Piper and Watsons Bay, which are on Port Jackson's east side towards the Pacific Ocean. Sydney Cove, a bay in Port Jackson's west side that includes Circular Quay, is more proximate to the Observatory Hill weather station, and therefore the climate data below does not apply to that vicinity.

Infrastructure

Bridges

Port Jackson is bridged from north to south by the Sydney Harbour Bridge, the Gladesville Bridge, the Ryde Bridge, and the Silverwater Bridge.

Other bridges spanning Port Jackson waterways are Pyrmont Bridge spanning Darling Harbour; the Anzac Bridge (formerly known as the Glebe Island Bridge), spanning Blackwattle Bay; the Iron Cove Bridge spanning Iron Cove; the Spit Bridge spanning Middle Harbour; the Roseville Bridge spanning Middle Harbour; the Tarban Creek Bridge spanning Tarban Creek.

The original Meadowbank Bridge carried two railway tracks, now reduced to pedestrian traffic only.  The new Meadowbank Bridge carries two railway tracks with piers suitable for four tracks.

There is a single track rail bridge on the Clyde to Carlingford railway line crossing the Parramatta River near Camellia.

A new bridge over Homebush Bay connects Wentworth Point and Rhodes

Punts 

 Mortlake Ferry

Weir 
A weir between Queens Avenue and Charles Street, Parramatta, called Charles Street Weir, separates the saltwater and tidal waters to the east from the freshwater and non-tidal waters to the west. The weir is marked right near the western (left) edge of the detailed map above.

Tunnels
A road tunnel, the Sydney Harbour Tunnel passing underneath the Harbour to the east of the bridge was opened in August 1992.

In 2005, 2010 and in 2014, the NSW Government proposed a rail tunnel be constructed to the west of the Sydney Harbour Bridge. Construction of an extra pair of road tunnels to the west of the Sydney Harbour Bridge, as part of the Sydney Metro project, was approved in January 2017 while the Harbour tunnelling was completed in March 2020.

The Western Harbour Tunnel & Beaches Link is planned to offer another motor vehicle tunnel in 2026.

Cruise ship terminals

Permanent cruise ship terminals are located at the Overseas Passenger Terminal at Circular Quay, Sydney Cove and at the White Bay Cruise Terminal at White Bay. White Bay's evolution to a cruise terminal came with the closure of Darling Harbour terminal to make way for the Barangaroo development.

Other port facilities
White Bay and adjacent Glebe Island have been working ports since the mid-1800s, handling just about everything from timber and paper, coal, sugar and cement to cars and containers. The NSW Government identified both as vital to the City's economy and in March 2013 announced its commitment to maintaining both as working ports as it frees up neighbouring bays for public access. Glebe Island is Sydney's last remaining deepwater port able to supply the City's ongoing demand for dry bulk goods such as sugar, gypsum and cement.

Most of Sydney's port infrastructure has moved south to Botany Bay since the construction of the first container terminals there in the late 1960s and early 1970s.

Military installations 

Former:
 Dawes Point Battery (1791)
 Fort Macquarie (1798)
 Middle Head Fortifications (1801)
 Fort Phillip (1804)
Goat Island (1826)
 Bradleys Head Fortification Complex (1840)
 Admiralty House (1856)
 Fort Denison (1857)
 Georges Head Battery (1871)
 Steel Point Battery (1874)
North Fort (1936)
 Sydney Harbour anti-submarine boom net (1942)
HMAS Platypus (1967)

Current:
   HMAS Kuttabul
 HMAS Penguin
HMAS Waterhen 
 HMAS Watson

Maritime transport

Sydney Ferries operate services from Circular Quay to Manly, Mosman, Taronga Zoo, Watsons Bay, Rose Bay, Barangaroo, Balmain, Parramatta, Milsons Point and other destinations.

Water taxi and water limousine operators offer transport not restricted by timetables or specific routes, and can also provide a service to or from private wharfs and houses on the waterfront. Sightseeing harbour cruises are operated daily from Circular Quay. Whale watching excursions are also operated from Port Jackson.

The Mortlake Ferry, also known as the Putney Punt, crosses the Parramatta River, connecting Mortlake and Putney.

Maritime heritage

Australian National Maritime Museum, at Darling Harbour, has themed exhibitions ranging from Indigenous lore and European seafaring to aquatic sport and maritime defence.

Sydney Heritage Fleet is a largely volunteer organisation dedicated to the restoration and operation of heritage vessels. The barque James Craig of the SHF sails regularly from Port Jackson.

RAN Heritage Centre at Garden Island has many exhibits, artefacts and documents relating to the history of the Royal Australian Navy.

Port Jackson is associated with the voyages of Richard Siddins.

Heritage listings 
Port Jackson has a number of heritage-listed sites, including:
 Fort Denison
 Goat Island
 SS South Steyne
 Bradleys Head: Bradleys Head Light Tower

Derivative unit of measure
A Sydharb is a unit of volume used in Australia for water, especially in dams and harbours.

Image gallery

See also 

 Sydney Harbour National Park
 List of bridges in Sydney
List of foreshore industrial sites on Sydney Harbour
 Geography of Sydney
 Richard Siddins
 Naval Base Sydney

References

External links 

 
 ABC Radio National: "A Living Harbour" – a history of Sydney Harbour.
 Official New South Wales Maritime Authority website
 Sydney Harbour Guide from Sydney.com
 Maps maintained by the New South Wales Maritime Authority (legal owner of the harbour bed):
 Port Jackson—east of Harbour Bridge
 Port Jackson—west of Harbour Bridge
 
 Sydney Harbour Federation Trust – established by the Australian Government to plan for the future of former Defence and other special Commonwealth Lands around Sydney Harbour.
 Sydney Ports
  [CC-By-SA]
  [CC-By-SA]
  [CC-By-SA]

 
Bays of New South Wales
Jackson
Geography of Sydney
Sydney New Year's Eve
Tourist attractions in Sydney
Northern Beaches